Xiaolu Guo FRSL (born 20 November 1973) is a Chinese-born British novelist, memoirist and film-maker, who explores migration, alienation, memory, personal journeys, feminism, translation and transnational identities.

Guo has directed a dozen films including documentaries and fictions. Her most well-known films include She, a Chinese and We Went to Wonderland. Her novels have been translated into 28 languages. Nine Continents: A Memoir In and Out of China won the National Book Critics Circle Award 2017. In 2013, she was named as one of Granta magazine's Best of Young British Novelists, a list drawn up once a decade. She is one of the inaugural fellows of the Columbia Institute of Ideas and Imagination in Paris, 2018, and a jury member for the Man Booker Prize 2019. She is currently a visiting professor and Writer-in-Residence at Columbia University in New York City.

Early life 

Xiaolu Guo grew up with her illiterate grandparents in a village of fishermen, then with her parents and brother in the city of Wenling, both in the Chinese coastal province of Zhejiang. Her father was a traditional landscape ink painter and her mother was a Red Guard during the Cultural Revolution. She published her first poetry collection in her teens while studying ink painting. In 1993, she left her province to study at the Beijing Film Academy (in the same class as Jia Zhangke) and later on studied Documentary Directing at the National Film and Television School in the UK. She moved to London in 2002 and has lived in Paris, Zurich and Berlin.

Career 

Xiaolu Guo has served on the judging panel for the Independent Foreign Fiction Prize and in 2016 she served as a jury for the Financial Times Emerging Voices Awards for Fiction. She has lectured on creative writing and film-making at King's College, London, the University of Westminster, Zurich University, Bern University, Swarthmore College in the United States and Harvard University. She is an honorary Professor at the University of Nottingham and a guest professor at the University of Bern in Switzerland. Guo was a guest of the DAAD Artists in Residence in Berlin in 2012 and a Writer in Residence of the Literaturhaus Zurich and the PWG Foundation in Zurich in 2015. She is currently a Writer in Residence of East Asian Department, Columbia University and a Visiting Professor at Baruch College, CUNY in New York City.

Books
Guo's 2005 autobiographical novel, Village of Stone focuses on two people, Coral and Red, who live together in Beijing, and how Coral's life changes one day when she receives a dried eel in the post, an anonymous gift from someone in her remote home village. Doris Lessing spoke highly of the book in 2004: "Reading it rather like finding yourself in a dream." The Times Literary Supplement praised the novel: "The language has the pared-down simplicity of a fable; the effect is a bit like that of a Haruki Murakami novel."

Guo's 2008 novel, A Concise Chinese-English Dictionary for Lovers, is the first one that she wrote in English after publishing her Chinese books. It tells the journey of a young Chinese woman in London. She soon renames herself "Z" and her encounters with an unnamed Englishman spur both of them to explore their own sense of identity. The novel is written in the heroine's broken English to begin with, in a dictionary form. With each chapter her English gradually improves, reflecting the improvement of the heroine's own English over the year in which the novel is set. American writer Ursula Le Guin reviewed the book in The Guardian: "We're in the hands of someone who knows how to tell a story [...] It succeeds in luring the western reader into an alien way of thinking: a trick only novels can pull off, and indeed one of their finest tricks."

Her 2009 novel UFO In Her Eyes, set in a semi-real Chinese village, is an experimental meta-fiction in the form of a series of police interviews about an alleged UFO sighting. The novel was adapted into a feature film, produced by Turkish German filmmaker Fatih Akin and directed by Xiaolu Guo herself. It received the Best Script Prize at the Hamburg International Film Festival.

Guo's 2010 novel, 20 Fragments of A Ravenous Youth, is a coming-of-age story about a 21-year-old Chinese woman Fenfang, her life as a film extra in Beijing, to which she has travelled far to seek her fortune, only to encounter a Communist regime that has outworn its welcome, a city in varying degrees of development, and sexism more in keeping with her peasant upbringing than the country's supposedly progressive capital.

Guo's 2010 book, Lovers in the Age of Indifference, is a collection of short stories that depicts the lives of people adrift between the West and the East, set in various locations.

In 2015, Xiaolu Guo published the novel I Am China, which she describes as "a parallel story about two Chinese lovers in exile – the external and internal exile that I had felt since leaving China". In the book, the London-based literary translator Iona Kirkpatrick discovers a story of romance and revolution as she translates a collection of letters and diaries by a Chinese punk musician named Kublai Jian. Unbeknownst to Iona, Jian has come to Britain seeking political asylum, while another character, Mu, is in Beijing trying to track him down. As the translator tracks the lovers' 20-year relationship, she develops a sense of purpose in deciding to bring Jian and Mu together again before it is too late. It was one of a NPR's Best Books of 2014.

In 2017, she published her memoir Once Upon a Time in the East (the US edition entitled Nine Continents: A Memoir In And Out Of China), which is a chronicle of her growing up in China in the 1970s and '80s and her journey to the West.

In 2020, her novel A Lover's Discourse was released by Grove Atlantic in the US and Penguin Random House (Chatto) in the UK.

Films
Guo's 2004 film is The Concrete Revolution, a film essay about the construction workers in Beijing building stadiums for the 2008 Olympics. It received Grand Prix at the International Human Rights Film Festival in Paris, 2005 and Special Mention at Chicago Documentary Film Festival.

Guo's 2006 film, How Is Your Fish Today?, inspired by Alain Robbe-Grillet's Trans-Europ-Express (1966) is a docu-drama set in modern China, focusing on the intertwined stories of two main characters; a frustrated writer (Rao Hui) and the subject of his latest film script, Lin Hao (Zijiang Yang). It was selected for the Official Competition at Sundance Film Festival 2007 and Rotterdam Film Festival, received Grand Prix at International Women's Film Festival in France.

Guo's 2008 film, We Went to Wonderland is a black and white essay film focusing on two elderly Chinese communists who arrive in the rundown East End of London and comment the Western world from their astonished Chinese perspective.
The film which premiered at the Rotterdam IFFR was immediately picked for the 2008 New Directors/New Films Festival of the MoMA / Lincoln Film Society in New York.

Guo's 2009 feature is She, a Chinese, a homage to Jean-Luc Godard's La Chinoise. This film won the Golden Leopard at the 2009 Locarno International Film Festival and the Best Script Award at the Hamburg Film Festival 2010. It has been distributed in the UK, France, Spain, Germany and Switzerland.

Guo's other 2009 film, Once upon a Time Proletarian, is a sister-film to She, a Chinese. This documentary looks at China in the post-Marxist era and examines different social classes in the society. It premieres at the Venice Film Festival 2009 and has been shown at Rotterdam IFFR and Sheffield Doc/Fest.

Guo's 2011 fiction feature, UFO In Her Eyes is a cinematic adaptation of her novel of the same title. The film stars Chinese actress Shi Ke and German cult figure Udo Kier and is a political metaphor recounted through the transformation that befalls a small Chinese village after an alleged UFO sighting. Inspired by Soviet cinema, Xiaolu Guo dedicated this film to Soy Cuba, a banned 1964 Soviet-Cuban film directed by Mikhail Kalatozov. It received the Public Award at Milan 3-Continental Film Festival 2013.

Guo's 2013 film, Late at Night, Voices of Ordinary Madness, focuses on Britain's underclass society, each fighting their ground in their own way. It is the second part of Guo's Tomorrow trilogy, continued after her documentary Once Upon A Time Proletarian. It premiered at the 57th BFI London Film Festival 2013 and Rotterdam Film Festival 2014, and was exhibited at the National Gallery of Art in Washington, DC.

Guo's 2018 documentary feature Five Men and A Caravaggio, is inspired by Walter Benjamin's landmark essay The Work of Art in the Age of Mechanical Reproduction (1936). It premiered at the BFI London Film Festival 2018 and the Athens Avant-Garde Film Festival in Greece 2018.

In 2020 Guo collaborated with the American Vietnamese filmmaker Trinh T. Minh-ha on Trinh's new film 'What About China?'.

Awards and nominations
Guo's third novel, A Concise Chinese-English Dictionary For Lovers, inspired by Roland Barthes's work, written originally in broken English, was nominated for the 2007 Orange Prize for Fiction and it has been translated into 26 languages. She was also the 2005 Pearl Award (UK) winner for Creative Excellence. Her first novel Village of Stone was nominated for the Independent Best Foreign Fiction Prize as well as the International Dublin Literary Awards. She writes in both English and Chinese, and has served as the jury member for the Independent Foreign Fiction Prize and International Dublin Literary Award. Her 2014 novel I Am China, set in Europe, China and America, was awarded for Giuseppe Acerbi Prize for Young Readers 2015 in Italy and longlisted for the 2015 Baileys Women's Prize for Fiction.

Her 2017 book Nine Continents: A Memoir In And Out Of China was the winner in the autobiography section of the National Books Critics Circle Award. It was shortlisted for the Costa Book Award and Royal Society of Literature Ondaatje Prize 2017.

Her feature film She, a Chinese premiered at the 2009 Locarno International Film Festival, where it immediately took the highest prize, the Golden Leopard. Her previous feature How Is Your Fish Today was in Official Selection at the 2007 Sundance Film Festival and received the Grand Jury Prize at the 2007 Créteil International Women's Film Festival in Paris. Her documentary We Went to Wonderland (2008) was selected for the New Directors/New Films Festival at the MoMA/Lincoln Center in New York in 2008. The Concrete Revolution premiered at the Margaret Mead Film Festival and IDFA 2005, among others. Once Upon A Time Proletarian was premiered at Venice Film Festival and Toronto Film Festival 2009, and received Grand Prix de Geneva at the Documentary Forum Rencontres Media Nord-Sud in Switzerland in 2012.
She was awarded the Gilda Film Prize for her film career at the 37th International Women Film Festival Florence in Italy, 2015.

Guo has had film retrospectives at the Cinema du Reel in the Pompidou Center 2010, the Swiss Cinematheque 2011, and with the Greek Film Archives in Athens, 2018.

In 2014, she was included in the BBC's 100 Women.

In 2019, she had a complete film retrospective at Whitechapel Gallery in London.

In 2020 she was longlisted for the Orwell Prize for Political Fiction and shortlisted for the Goldsmiths Prize for A Lover's Discourse.

List of books
 Poetry Collection (诗集, Shījí) (1991).
 Who is my mother's boyfriend? (我妈妈的男朋友是谁？, Wǒ māmā de nán péngyǒu shì shéi?) (screenplay collection, 1998).
 Flying in My Dreams (梦中或不是梦中的飞行, Mèng zhōng huò bùshì mèng zhōng de fēixíng) (essay collection, 1999).
 Fenfang's 37.2 Degrees (芬芳的37.2度 Fēnfāng de 37.2 dù) (novel, 2000). Translated as 20 Fragments of a Ravenous Youth (2008)
 Film Notes (电影理论笔记, Diànyǐng lǐlùn bǐjì) (film critics, 2001).
 Movie Map (电影地图, Diànyǐng dìtú) (film critics, 2001).
 Village of Stone (我心中的石头镇, Wǒ xīnzhōng de shítou zhèn) (novel, 2003).
 A Concise Chinese-English Dictionary For Lovers (novel, 2007).
 20 Fragments of a Ravenous Youth (novel, 2008).
 UFO in Her Eyes (novel, 2009).
 Lovers in the Age of Indifference (short story collection, 2010).
 I am China (novel, 2014).
 Once Upon A Time in the East: A Story of Growing up (memoir, 2017).
 Also published in the United States with the title Nine Continents: A Memoir In and Out of China (October 2017).
 A Lover's Discourse (novel, 2020)
 Radical (memoir, 2023)

Essays
 A Soul In Sakhalin (2009), First published on BBC 3, The Essay
 Further Notes Towards A Metaphysical Cinema Manifesto (2010)
 Notes Towards A Metaphysical Cinema Manifesto (2010)
 Beyond Dissidence (2012), First published in The Independent
 Coolies (2013), 14-18 NOW
 Memories of An Island (2014) Dark Mountain, Issue 7
 The Blood Eater (2014), First published in the Intelligent Life
 Reading Howl in China (2014), First published in Aeon Magazine
 Waiting for the Second Renaissance (2014)
 The Ying and Yang of Heidi  (2016), Viceversa Literatur
 My Writing Day (2016), The Guardian
 Fishermen Always Eat Fish Eyes First  (2017), Freeman's Home

Filmography

As director, producer and screenwriter
 Far and Near (Documentary Essay, 2003)
 The Concrete Revolution (Documentary, 2004)
 How Is Your Fish Today? (Fiction Feature, 2006)
 Address Unknown (Fiction short, Visual Essay 2007)
 We Went to Wonderland (Documentary, 2008)
 An Archeologist's Sunday (Fiction Short, 2008)
 Once upon a time Proletarian (Documentary, 2009)
 She, a Chinese (Fiction Feature, 2009)
 UFO in Her Eyes (Fiction Feature, 2011)
 Late At Night - Voices of Ordinary Madness (Documentary, 2013)
 Five Men And A Caravaggio (Documentary reconstruction, 2018)

As screenwriter
 Love in the Internet Age (Wangluo shidai de aiqing) (1998)
 The House (Menghuan tianyuan) (1999)

As playwright
 Beijing's Slowest Elevator (2009), BBC Radio 3
 Dostoevsky and the Chickens (2014), BBC Radio 3, the Wire

Awards

UFO in Her Eyes
Public Award, Milan 3 Continents International Film Festival, 2010 
City of Venice Award (2nd Prize), Premio Città di Venezia, 70a Mostra Internazionale d'Arte Cinematografica 2013

She, A Chinese
Golden Leopard Award (Grand Prix) in the International Competition, Locarno International Film Festival 2009. 
Mount Blanc Prize for the Best Script, Hamburg Film Festival 2009.

Once Upon A Time Proletarian
Grand Prix de Geneva, Forum 2011.
Nomination, Horizon Award, Venice Film Festival 2009

How Is Your Fish Today?
Grand Prix, Créteil International Women's Film Festival 2007, France; 
Nominated, Best Drama at Sundance Film Festival 2007; 
Special Mention at the Rotterdam Film Festival's Tiger Award 2007, Special Mention at the Pesaro Film Festival 2007 and the Fribourg Film Festival 2007.

The Concrete Revolution
Grand Prix, International Human Rights Film Festival, Paris 2005;
Nomination Best Documentary at Chicago Documentary Film Festival 2005;
Special Jury Prize at EBS International Documentary Festival, Seoul 2005

Far and Near
ICA Beck's Future Student Prize 2003, Institute of Contemporary Arts, London

2008:  Orange Prize for Fiction shortlist, A Concise Chinese-English Dictionary for Lovers
2013: Granta "Best of Young British Novelists"
2017: National Books Critics Circle Award, Nine Continents 
2017: Costa Book Award shortlist, Once Upon A Time In The East 
2018: Royal Society of Literature Ondaatje Prize shortlist, Once Upon A Time In The East 
2018: Rathbones Folio Prize shortlist, Once Upon A Time In The East

References

External links

  The New York Review, June 10, 2021 issue
 Reflections of an Environmental Refugee
 Granta Magazine Podcast interview
 BBC HARDtalk
 Critic's Talk, Rotterdam Film Festival
 Documentaries on globalization, Cinema Studies, University of Pennsylvania
 37e Cinema du Reel, Xiaolu Guo Masterclass
 Interview with Xiaolu Guo
 HOW IS YOUR FISH TODAY? site for Independent Lens on PBS
 Twenty Fragments of a Ravenous Youth, reviewed in Northwest Asian Weekly.
 Entry in The Encyclopedia of Science Fiction
 "Reading Howl in China", essay, 20 August 2014, Aeon.

1973 births
Exophonic writers
Living people
Film directors from Zhejiang
Writers from Taizhou, Zhejiang
Post 70s Generation
20th-century Chinese women writers
20th-century Chinese writers
21st-century Chinese women writers
21st-century Chinese writers
Chinese film directors
Chinese women novelists
British people of Chinese descent
BBC 100 Women
Beijing Film Academy alumni
Chevening Scholars